Richard Francis Talbot (December 1710 – 12 March 1752) was a French soldier and diplomat of Irish descent.

Talbot was born in France to Irish exiles, the son of Richard Talbot (son of William Talbot) and Charlotte Talbot (daughter of Richard Talbot, 1st Earl of Tyrconnell). Talbot's paternal grandfather had assumed the title of Talbot's maternal grandfather in 1691, and in 1724 Talbot became the titular Earl of Tyrconnell in Jacobite circles.

In 1721 he joined Fitzjames' Horse, a regiment in the Irish Brigade of the French Royal Army. He was promoted to captain in 1729 and served under James FitzJames, 1st Duke of Berwick in the War of the Polish Succession. He later served in Bavaria, Upper Alsace and Lower Rhine. Talbot was captured by British forces in a ship off the coast of Ostend while attempting to sail to join the Jacobite Rising of 1745, but was later released in a prisoner exchange. He was appointed Maréchal de camp in April 1748 during the Siege of Maastricht and was honoured as a chevalier of the Order of St Louis.

After the Treaty of Aix-la-Chapelle, Talbot was named by Louis XV as his ambassador to the Kingdom of Prussia, arriving in Berlin in March 1750. From September 1751 his health declined rapidly and he died in Berlin in March 1752.

He was described by Thomas Carlyle as "a Jacobite Irishman, of blusterous qualities, though with plenty of sagacity and rough sense".

References

1710 births
1752 deaths
18th-century Irish people
Ambassadors of France to Prussia
Earls in the Jacobite peerage
French military personnel of the War of the Austrian Succession
French military personnel of the War of the Polish Succession
Irish expatriates in France
Irish Jacobites
Irish soldiers in the French Army
Jacobite military personnel of the Jacobite rising of 1745
Knights of the Order of Saint Louis
Richard Francis